Whittier High School (WHS) is a high school located in Whittier, California. It belongs to the Whittier Union High School District.
It is the alma mater of President Richard Nixon (class of 1930) and John Lasseter (class of 1975), founder of Pixar.

History 

Whittier High School was established in 1900 when the few classes were in the upper floor of the old Jonathan Bailey School. At that time, there were 47 students in attendance. The classrooms included a study hall, a library, a recitation room, a science laboratory, and the principal's office. The library contained one stack of books. For a heating unit, there was an old-fashioned wood stove. A few pictures and a statue of Julius Caesar ornamented the building.

Following the addition of the East Whittier, Ranchito, Rivera, Los Nietos, Pico, and Mill Districts, the school became known as Whittier Union High School. In 1905 a new building was opened at the corner of Philadelphia and Lindley, which is the current site of Whittier High School today.

A rapid influx of students necessitated the constructions of a girls' gym, an administration building and an auditorium in 1923. Soon after, the shops on Pierce Avenue were built.

The 1933 Long Beach earthquake rendered most of the buildings unsafe. Classes were held in crowded storerooms, basements, and bungalows until condemned buildings could be reconstructed. The Science Building was rebuilt in 1934; a Boys' Gym in 1935; dressing rooms and Cafeteria in 1936. The Auditorium stood idle for almost 20 years and then was renovated into the present Library.

In 1938, the District approved bonds for a new Girls' Gym and an Auditorium. Both were completed in 1940.

Following World War II, the Whittier area began to grow rapidly. In 1952, the student enrollment was over 3,500. It was at this time that the District opened a new high school called El Rancho. Growth continued and in 1953, California High School opened, followed by Santa Fe in 1955, Sierra in 1957, Pioneer in 1959, La Serna in 1961, and Monte Vista in 1964. By 1966, the District had almost 16,000 students in seven schools.

In 1967, Buffalo Springfield performed in the Whittier High School auditorium.

Because of declining enrollment, two of the schools closed in 1979. Many students from the Sierra High School area came to Whittier. Since that time, Whittier High School's enrollment has slowly increased each year.

Several areas of the Whittier High School campus were featured as Hill Valley High School in the 1985 blockbuster film Back to the Future, and its 1989 sequel Back to the Future Part II.

From government sources (including the Federal Emergency Management Agency) and bond financing, monies have been obtained for district-wide structural repairs. The seismic repairs and remodeling are still under way.

In 1998 the Boys Gym was destroyed by fire. The new Perry Gym opened in 2002. The Holloway-Poucher Aquatic Center was completed in 2001. Other buildings and areas on campus are named after alumni and members of the Cardinal community: the O.C. Albertson field after the first principal, the Myron Claxton ('36) Science Building, the Vic Lopez ('46) Auditorium, the Bob Chandler ('67) Sports Complex and the Marion Wilson Hodges fountain, also a former principal.

History of the Whittier Cardinal

In 1930, the cardinal was chosen as the Whittier High mascot because it is a native of Mill Creek (the area just north of Rio Hondo College). The bird was chosen because of its scarlet coat, which corresponded with the school colors. It was also felt that this bird possessed the same spirit and determination that has always been representative of Whittier High School.

In 1935, the Cardinal insignia was designed as a result of a contest, which lasted four months. The event was culminated by a special student body election to choose what has become the Cardinal insignia. Since then, the insignia has been used on class rings, pins, the Cardinal Key, and a victory flag.

Students

Ethnic breakdown (2007-2008 year)

Average class size (2017-2018 year)

30 Students

Notable alumni

Patty Caretto (Brown) 1969, U.S. Olympian; former world-record holder in the women's 800 meters and 1500 meters; International Swimming Hall of Fame member
George Buehler 1965, professional football player for the Oakland Raiders
Bob Chandler 1967, professional football player for the Buffalo Bills and the Oakland Raiders
Helen Hannah, 1934, United States Marine 1943–75, chaperone in All-American Girls Professional Baseball League
John Lasseter 1975, writer, director, producer, founder of Pixar Animation Studios
Neal Moore 1990, writer and canoeist
Richard Nixon 1930, U.S. Representative, Senator, Vice President and 37th President of the United States 1969–1974
Vaneza Pitynski 2006, actress
Paul Pugh, Rear Admiral USN 1937, fighter pilot
 Art Sherman (born 1937), horse trainer and jockey

References

External links

Whittier High School Cardinal Band Website
Whittier Union High School Class of 1927 Yearbook
Whittier High School Class of 1967 Reunion Committee Website

Whittier, California
High schools in Los Angeles County, California
Educational institutions established in 1900
Public high schools in California
1900 establishments in California